Train Master may refer to:

Transportation 
 FM Train Master, the promotional name of the Fairbanks-Morse FM H-24-66 Diesel Locomotive
 Conductor (transportation), a person responsible for train operations